Rafael Carlos Pérez González (born 23 July 1948), known as Marañón, is a Spanish former footballer who played as a striker.

Even though he started professionally at Real Madrid, his career was mainly associated with Espanyol. Over the course of 13 seasons, he amassed La Liga totals of 308 games and 116 goals.

Marañón appeared with Spain at the 1978 World Cup.

Club career
Born in Olite, Navarre, Marañón arrived in the Real Madrid youth system at the age of 19, making his professional debuts with Ontinyent CF in Segunda División, on loan (a similar move occurred in the following season with Sporting de Gijón). He joined Real's first team permanently in 1970, but never imposed himself at the club during his four-year spell, appearing in a maximum of 19 La Liga games in the 1973–74 campaign.

Marañón's sporting fate changed in 1974, as he signed with RCD Espanyol. After two slow seasons he would never score in single digits again, also playing European competition with the Catalans, gaining captaincy and reaching the national side.

Marañón retired in 1986 at nearly 38, after three years with Espanyol neighbours CE Sabadell FC, helping them promote to the second level in his first. He finished his career as the former's top scorer in the top division, with a total of 111 goals; his record would stand for 24 years until another club legend, Raúl Tamudo, broke it in 2007 during a 2–2 away draw against FC Barcelona.

International career
Capping off his best season at Espanyol – 22 goals, good enough for joint-second behind Valencia CF's Mario Kempes, as the team nearly qualified for Europe – Marañón made his debut for Spain, appearing in a 1–1 friendly with Hungary in Alicante on 27 March 1977. Scored a gol (direct from the corner) against Mexico on the 26th april 1978, in a 2-0 win in Granada. Subsequently, he was picked for the squad for the 1978 FIFA World Cup but did not play in the finals, earning a total of four caps in roughly one year.

Honours
Sporting Gijón
Segunda División: 1969–70

Real Madrid
La Liga: 1971–72
Copa del Generalísimo: 1973–74

Sabadell
Segunda División B: 1983–84

References

External links

1948 births
Living people
People from Olite
Spanish footballers
Footballers from Navarre
Association football forwards
La Liga players
Segunda División players
Segunda División B players
Real Madrid CF players
Ontinyent CF players
Sporting de Gijón players
RCD Espanyol footballers
CE Sabadell FC footballers
Spain international footballers
1978 FIFA World Cup players
Basque Country international footballers